Germanus V (6 December 1835 – 28 July 1920) was the Ecumenical Patriarch of Constantinople from 28 January 1913 till 1918. He was educated in Jerusalem and Athens before attending the Theological School of Halki. Germain V of Constantinople (in Greek Γερμανός Ε ', born 6 December 1835 in Balata du Phanar in Constantinople under the name Georges Kavakopoulos; died 18 July 1920) was patriarch of Constantinople from 10 February 1913 to 25 October 1918.

Biography 
He was elected Metropolitan of Kos (1867), Rhodes (1876–1888), Iraklia (1888–1897) and Chalkedon (1897–1913).  On 28 January 1913, he was elected Ecumenical Patriarch.

He was one of the pioneers, in the years 1886–1897, of the efforts for the return of the exiled Patriarch Ioakim III the Magnificent. On 7 October 1918 a great rebellion against the Orthodox came and was condemned within the Patriarchal Church. He was forced to resign from the throne on 12 October 1918, retiring to Kadikoy, where he died and was buried in December 1920. He was the last Patriarch who received the imperial veranda, the state's recognition of the Sultan.

1920 encyclical 
Germain V is the author of an encyclical published in 1920 as a milestone for the ecumenical movement. He evokes the notion of a "fraternity of churches" to be created, a "blessed union" of the churches for which he invites different traditions to contribute by engaging in the joint study of the essential questions around the notion of meeting.

1. For the Patriarch, the promotion of contacts between the Churches is the first essential step that must be followed by "the abolition of all mutual mistrust and bitterness" so that "the love [is] revived and strengthened between the churches".

2. It then lists eleven basic points as a working proposal for future collaboration between the churches; Willem Vissert Hooft, first secretary of the WCC, that the "With its 1920 encyclical, Constantinople rang the bell of our assembling".

References 

1835 births
1920 deaths
Theological School of Halki alumni
Orthodox bishops of Rhodes
Cappadocian Greeks
20th-century Ecumenical Patriarchs of Constantinople
Bishops of Chalcedon
Clergy from Istanbul
People from Fatih